Equidimensional may refer to:
Equidimensional (geology) used to describe the shape of three-dimensional objects.
Equidimensionality: property of a space that the local dimension is the same everywhere.